Duncan Williams may refer to:
Duncan Williams (born 1986), Irish rugby union player
Duncan Williams (newspaper executive), (born 1964), British news and sports publisher
Duncan Ryūken Williams (born 1969), Soto Zen Buddhist priest
Nicholas Duncan-Williams (born 1957), Archbishop of the Action Chapel International ministry
Randa Williams (née Duncan; born 1962), heir to the Duncan family fortune, via Enterprise Products